IS–LM model, or Hicks–Hansen model, is a  two-dimensional macroeconomic tool that shows the relationship between interest rates and assets market (also known as real output in goods and services market plus money market). The intersection of the "investment–saving" (IS) and "liquidity preference–money supply" (LM) curves models "general equilibrium" where supposed simultaneous equilibria occur in both the goods and the asset markets. Yet two equivalent interpretations are possible: first, the IS–LM model explains changes in national income when the price level is fixed in the short-run; second, the IS–LM model shows why an aggregate demand curve can shift.
Hence, this tool is sometimes used not only to analyse economic fluctuations but also to suggest potential levels for appropriate stabilisation policies.

The model was developed by John Hicks in 1937 and was later extended by Alvin Hansen, as a mathematical representation of Keynesian macroeconomic theory. Between the 1940s and mid-1970s, it was the leading framework of macroeconomic analysis. While it has been largely absent from macroeconomic research ever since, it is still a backbone conceptual introductory tool in many macroeconomics textbooks. By itself, the IS–LM model is used to study the short run when prices are fixed or sticky and no inflation is taken into consideration. But in practice the main role of the model is as a path to explain the AD–AS model.

History
The IS–LM model was introduced at a conference of the Econometric Society held in Oxford during September 1936. Roy Harrod, John R. Hicks, and James Meade all presented papers
describing mathematical models attempting to summarize John Maynard Keynes' General Theory of Employment, Interest, and Money. Hicks, who had seen a draft of Harrod's paper, invented the IS–LM model (originally using the abbreviation "LL", not "LM"). He later presented it in
"Mr. Keynes and the Classics: A Suggested Interpretation".

Although generally accepted as being imperfect, the model is seen as a useful pedagogical tool for imparting an understanding of the questions that macroeconomists today attempt to answer through more nuanced approaches. As such, it is included in most undergraduate macroeconomics textbooks, but omitted from most graduate texts due to the current dominance of real business cycle and new Keynesian theories. For a contemporary and alternative reinvention of the IS-LM approach that uses Keynesian Search Theory, see Roger Farmer's work on the IS-LM-NAC model, part of his broader research agenda which studies how beliefs independently influence macroeconomic outcomes.

Formation

The point where the IS and LM schedules intersect represents a short-run equilibrium in the real and monetary sectors (though not necessarily in other sectors, such as labor markets): both the product market and the money market are in equilibrium. This equilibrium yields a unique combination of the interest rate and real GDP.

IS (investment–saving) curve

The IS curve shows the causation from interest rates to planned investment to national income and output.

For the investment–saving curve, the independent variable is the interest rate and the dependent variable is the level of income. The IS curve is drawn as downward-sloping with the interest rate r on the vertical axis and GDP (gross domestic product: Y) on the horizontal axis. The IS curve represents the locus where total spending (consumer spending + planned private investment + government purchases + net exports) equals total output (real income, Y, or GDP).

The IS curve also represents the equilibria where total private investment equals total saving, with saving equal to consumer saving plus government saving (the budget surplus) plus foreign saving (the trade surplus). The level of real GDP (Y) is determined along this line for each interest rate. Every level of the real interest rate will generate a certain level of investment and spending: lower interest rates encourage higher investment and more spending. The multiplier effect of an increase in fixed investment resulting from a lower interest rate raises real GDP. This explains the downward slope of the IS curve. In summary, the IS curve shows the causation from interest rates to planned fixed investment to rising national income and output.

The IS curve is defined by the equation

where Y represents income,  represents consumer spending increasing as a function of disposable income (income, Y, minus taxes, T(Y), which themselves depend positively on income),  represents business investment decreasing as a function of the real interest rate, G represents government spending, and NX(Y) represents net exports (exports minus imports) decreasing as a function of income (decreasing because imports are an increasing function of income).

LM (liquidity-money) curve

The LM curve shows the combinations of interest rates and levels of real income for which the money market is in equilibrium.  It shows where money demand equals money supply.  For the LM curve, the independent variable is income and the dependent variable is the interest rate.

In the money market equilibrium diagram, the liquidity preference function is the willingness to hold cash. The liquidity preference function is downward sloping (i.e. the willingness to hold cash increases as the interest rate decreases). Two basic elements determine the quantity of cash balances demanded:
 Transactions demand for money: this includes both (a) the willingness to hold cash for everyday transactions and (b) a precautionary measure (money demand in case of emergencies). Transactions demand is positively related to real GDP. As GDP is considered exogenous to the liquidity preference function, changes in GDP shift the curve. 
 Speculative demand for money: this is the willingness to hold cash instead of securities as an asset for investment purposes. Speculative demand is inversely related to the interest rate. As the interest rate rises, the opportunity cost of holding money rather than investing in securities increases. So, as interest rates rise, speculative demand for money falls.

Money supply is determined by central bank decisions and willingness of commercial banks to loan money. Money supply in effect is perfectly inelastic with respect to nominal interest rates. Thus the money supply function is represented as a vertical line – money supply is a constant, independent of the interest rate, GDP, and other factors. Mathematically, the LM curve is defined by the equation , where the supply of money is represented as the real amount M/P (as opposed to the nominal amount M), with P representing the price level, and L being the real demand for money, which is some function of the interest rate and the level of real income.

An increase in GDP shifts the liquidity preference function rightward and hence increases the interest rate. Thus the LM function is positively sloped.

Shifts
One hypothesis is that a government's deficit spending ("fiscal policy") has an effect similar to that of a lower saving rate or increased private fixed investment, increasing the amount of demand for goods at each individual interest rate. An increased deficit by the national government shifts the IS curve to the right.  This raises the equilibrium interest rate (from i1 to i2) and national income (from Y1 to Y2), as shown in the graph above.  The equilibrium level of national income in the IS–LM diagram is referred to as aggregate demand.

Keynesians argue spending may actually "crowd in" (encourage) private fixed investment via the accelerator effect, which helps long-term growth. Further, if government deficits are spent on productive public investment (e.g., infrastructure or public health) that spending directly and eventually raises potential output, although not necessarily more (or less) than the lost private investment might have. The extent of any crowding out depends on the shape of the LM curve.  A shift in the IS curve along a relatively flat LM curve can increase output substantially with little change in the interest rate. On the other hand, an rightward shift in the IS curve along a vertical LM curve will lead to higher interest rates, but no change in output (this case represents the "Treasury view").

Rightward shifts of the IS curve also result from exogenous increases in investment spending (i.e., for reasons other than interest rates or income), in consumer spending, and in export spending by people outside the economy being modelled, as well as by exogenous decreases in spending on imports.  Thus these too raise both equilibrium income and the equilibrium interest rate.  Of course, changes in these variables in the opposite direction shift the IS curve in the opposite direction.

The IS–LM model also allows for the role of monetary policy. If the money supply is increased, that shifts the LM curve downward or to the right, lowering interest rates and raising equilibrium national income.  Further, exogenous decreases in liquidity preference, perhaps due to improved transactions technologies, lead to downward shifts of the LM curve and thus increases in income and decreases in interest rates. Changes in these variables in the opposite direction shift the LM curve in the opposite direction.

Incorporation into larger models
By itself, the IS–LM model is used to study the short run when prices are fixed or sticky and no inflation is taken into consideration. But in practice the main role of the model is as a sub-model of larger models (especially the Aggregate Demand-Aggregate Supply model – the AD–AS model) which allow for a flexible price level. In the aggregate demand-aggregate supply model, each point on the aggregate demand curve is an outcome of the IS–LM model for aggregate demand Y based on a particular price level.  Starting from one point on the aggregate demand curve, at a particular price level and a quantity of aggregate demand implied by the IS–LM model for that price level, if one considers a higher potential price level, in the IS–LM model the real money supply M/P will be lower and hence the LM curve will be shifted higher, leading to lower aggregate demand as measured by the horizontal location of the IS–LM intersection; hence at the higher price level the level of aggregate demand is lower, so the aggregate demand curve is negatively sloped.

Introduction of the new full equilibrium (FE) component: The IS–LM–FE model 
Sir John Hicks, a Nobel laureate, created the model in 1937 as a graphical representation of the ideas introduced by John Maynard Keynes in his influential 1936 book, The General Theory of Employment, Interest, and Money.  In his original IS–LM model, Hicks assumed that the price level was fixed, reflecting John Maynard Keynes' belief that wages and prices do not adapt quickly to clear markets.

The introduction of an adjustment to Hicks' loose assumption of a fixed price level requires allowing the price level to change. Allowing the price level to change necessitates the addition of a third component, the full equilibrium (FE) condition. When this component is added to the IS–LM model, a new model called IS–LM–FE emerges. The IS–LM–FE model is widely used in cyclical fluctuations analysis, forecasting, and macroeconomic policymaking. There are many advantages to using the IS–LM–FE model as a framework for both classical and Keynesian analyses: First, rather than learning two different models for classical and Keynesian analyses, a single model can be used for both. Second, using a single framework highlights the many areas of agreement between the Keynesian and classical approaches while also emphasizing the differences between them. Furthermore, since various versions of the IS–LM–FE model (along with its ideas and terminology) are frequently used in economic and macroeconomic policy analyses, studying this framework will help to understand and engage in contemporary economic debates. Three approaches are used when analyzing this economic model: graphical, numerical, and algebraic.

Reinventing IS-LM: the IS-LM-NAC model

In the IS-LM-NAC model, the long-run effect of monetary policy depends on the way people form beliefs. Roger Farmer and Konstantin Platonov study a case they call 'persistent adaptive beliefs' in which people believe, correctly, that shocks to asset values are permanent. The important innovation in this work is a model of the labor market in which there can be a continuum of long-run steady state equilibria.

See also

 Keynesian cross
 AD–IA model
 IS/MP model
 Mundell–Fleming model
 National savings
 Policy mix

References

Further reading

External links

 Krugman, Paul. There's something about macro – An explanation of the model and its role in understanding macroeconomics.
 Krugman, Paul. IS-LMentary – A basic explanation of the model and its uses.
 Wiens, Elmer G. IS–LM model – An online, interactive IS–LM model of the Canadian economy.

Economics curves
Economics models
General equilibrium theory
Keynesian economics
1937 in economics